Parallel Universe is the second studio album by English drum and bass group 4hero, released in 1994.

Reception

Parallel Universe has been viewed as a landmark release in jungle and drum and bass music. Clash wrote that it "has been credited as the first drum and bass LP", while AllMusic critic John Bush described it as "the album that showed what jungle was capable of in the full-length medium".

Track listing

References

4hero albums
1995 albums